Lage Herbert Tedenby (born 21 May 1937) is a retired Swedish long-distance runner. He competed in the steeplechase at the 1960 Summer Olympics, but failed to reach the final. Tedenby won the steeplechase at the 1961 Nordic Championships. Later he had a serious traffic accident, but recovered and won the national 10,000 m title in 1967.

References

1937 births
Living people
Swedish male steeplechase runners
Olympic athletes of Sweden
Athletes (track and field) at the 1960 Summer Olympics